The 39th government of Turkey (31 March 1975 – 21 June 1977) was a historical government of Turkey. It is also called the fourth Demirel cabinet and First Nationalist Front.

Background 
After Bülent Ecevit of the Republican People's Party (CHP), who was the prime minister of the 37th government resigned, Turkey experienced a period of cabinet crises. During a period of more than four months, the government was a caretakers government led by Sadi Irmak. Finally, four parties formed the 39th government. The prime minister was Süleyman Demirel, the leader of Justice Party (AP). Other partners were National Salvation Party (MSP), Republican Reliance Party (CGP), and Nationalist Movement Party (MHP).

The government
In the list below, the serving period of cabinet members who served only a part of the cabinet's lifespan are shown in the column "Notes". According to the Turkish constitution some members of the government were replaced by independent members before the elections.

Aftermath
The government ended with the general elections held on 5 June 1977.

References

Cabinets established in 1975
Cabinets of Turkey
Cabinets disestablished in 1977
Coalition governments of Turkey
Justice Party (Turkey)
Members of the 39th government of Turkey
1975 establishments in Turkey
1977 disestablishments in Turkey
15th parliament of Turkey